Mohammad Ghazi may refer to:
 Mohammad Ghazi (footballer), Iranian footballer
 Mohammad Ghazi (politician), Indian politician
 Mohammad Ghazi (translator), Iranian translator